Myrica esculenta is a  tree or large shrub native to the hills of northern India, southern Bhutan and Nepal.  Its common names include box myrtle, bayberry  and kaphal. Its berries are edible and are consumed locally. It is the state fruit of the northern Indian state of Uttarakhand.

Habitat

It is also found at elevations below  in the midhills of Nepal. It is also found in Ziro, Arunachal Pradesh and some parts of Himachal Pradesh and Meghalaya.

Morphology
Bark is soft and brittle. Flowers are of white color and are found in bunches. Fruit is a globose, succulent drupe, with a hard endocarp; diameter ; average mass . Seeds are triangular in shape and are astringent in taste.

According to Ayurveda, it has two varieties based on the color of flower: Shweta (white) and Rakta (red).

Chemical constituents
The bark is yellow and contains the chemical substances myricetin, myricitrin and glycosides. Leaves of the plant also contain flavone-4'-hydroxy-3',5,5'-trimethoxy-7-O-β-I-D-glucopyranosy)(1→4)-α-L-rhamnopyranoside; flavone-3',4'-dihydroxy-6-methoxy-7-O-α-L-rhamnopyranoside; β-sitosterol; β-sitosterol-β-D-glucopyranoside and quercetin.

References

Plants used in Ayurveda
esculenta
Trees of Nepal
Flora of West Himalaya
Flora of India (region)